Dhaka Dental College and Hospital, abbreviated DDC, is the largest dental school in Bangladesh. It was the first dental school in East Pakistan and was established in August 1961. It's the only governmental dental college in Bangladesh that oversees a 200-bed hospital in Dhaka.

Courses
The college offers five-year BDS course (under Dhaka University). It also offers MS courses affiliated to Bangabandhu Sheikh Mujib Medical University (BSMMU). Under Bangladesh College of Physicians and Surgeons (BCPS) the FCPS courses are also offered.

Undergraduate (BDS)

Postgraduate (FCPS)

Postgraduate (MS)

Facilities
The following facilities are in the  hospital area:
 Administration building 
 Academic building
 Auditorium
 Two lecture galleries
 One hospital building
 Two ladies hostel 
 Boy's hostel 
 Staff colony
 Teachers colony
 Mosque 
 Shaheed minar ('Martyr Monument')
 Another boy's hostel is situated in Sobhanbag, Dhaka

Ladies' hostel
Two ladies' hostels houses 300 students on campus premises.

Boys' hostel (Mirpur)
The boy's hostel houses 60 and is for juniors, especially 1st- and 2nd-year students.

Boys' hostel (Sobahanbag)
This hostel houses 300 and is for 3rd year, final year and intern doctors.

Academic building 
The academic building is a five-story building housing seven departments, a library, two clubs, three common rooms, and a canteen. Each department has well-furnished lecture rooms and laboratories.

Library
An air-conditioned library hosts 14,000+ medical and dental books along with 122 regular and irregular journals.

Hospital building
The hospital is the largest dental hospital in Bangladesh with a seven-story building and 200 beds. Facilities allow pathological tests, radiotherapy, OPG, general and dental X-ray services.

Administration
Dhaka dental college has a well-organized administration faculty. A teachers' association runs the college; the principal is the chief, and the teachers are members. The administration office is combined with the principal and vice-principal, secretary, student's section, and accountant's offices.

Dental chairs

Hospital beds

OT facilities
 Oral & Maxillo-Facial Surgery Department
 General Surgery Department

Transport
A college bus is available for students.

Extracurricular activities
Cultural programs and competitions occur throughout the year.

Gallery

References

External links
 Dhaka Dental College Website
 Ministry of Health and Family Welfare
 Ministry of Health and Family Welfare (MOHFW)||HEALTH BULLETIN 2016

Hospitals in Dhaka
Dental schools in Bangladesh